MLB 2002 is a Major League Baseball video game in the Genre of Sports developed by 989 Sports and published by Sony Computer Entertainment America for PlayStation. The cover athlete is Center fielder Andruw Jones of the Atlanta Braves. Vin Scully is the play-by-play announcer with Dave Campbell on color commentary.

The game was preceded by MLB 2001 and succeeded by MLB 2003.

Reception

The game received "generally favorable reviews" according to the review aggregation website Metacritic.

References

External links
 
 

2001 video games
Major League Baseball video games
North America-exclusive video games
PlayStation (console) games
PlayStation (console)-only games
Video games developed in the United States
Video games set in 2002